Eudamidas III (reigned from 241 to 228 BC), son of Agis IV and Agiatis, daughter of Gylippus, was king of Sparta and a member of the Eurypontid dynasty. When his father was murdered he had just been born. Due to his minor age he never reigned and was succeeded by his uncle Archidamus V.

3rd-century BC rulers
3rd-century BC Spartans
Eurypontid kings of Sparta
Ancient child monarchs